Franklin County is a county located in the U.S. state of Idaho. As of the 2020 Census the county had a population of 14,194. The county seat and largest city is Preston. The county was established in 1913 and named after Franklin D. Richards, an Apostle of the Church of Jesus Christ of Latter-day Saints. It is the only Franklin County in the United States that is not named after Benjamin Franklin. Franklin County is part of the Logan, UT-ID Metropolitan Statistical Area.

History
Idaho's oldest permanent non-native settlement occurred at Franklin on April 14, 1860, when Mormon settlers led by Thomas S. Smart established the settlement at its present location on the Cub River. It was the seventh and northernmost settlement in the Cache Valley at the time of its settlement and was believed to be in Utah until the Idaho boundary with Utah was finalized in 1872. All of the county's incorporated cities were settled by 1868 with Oxford settled in 1864, Weston in 1865, Dayton in 1868, Clifton in 1869, and Preston by 1868. The Bear River Massacre took place in present-day Franklin County on January 29, 1863.

While the settlers at Franklin were effectively governed by Utah Territory until 1872, the settlers were actually located within Washington Territory from 1860 to 1863 and not within the boundary of any county until Shoshone was created in 1861. They became part of Idaho County in 1861, and Boise in 1863. And finally, under Idaho Territory, they briefly became part of Owyhee County before being transferred to Oneida County in 1864. At the 1870 census, the three Franklin County precincts were enumerated in Cache County, Utah, containing 1,053 residents. In 1885, the northern portion of the county was transferred to Bingham County at its creation. At the 1890 Census, Bingham and Oneida Counties returned five precincts of Dayton, Franklin, Oxford, Preston, and Treasureton with 4,969 residents. The Oxford and Treasureton precincts were transferred to Bannock County at its establishment in 1893. Bannock County retained the Oxford precinct and renamed the Treasureton Precinct as Cleveland. By 1900, Oneida contained seven precincts that would later be entirely within Franklin County. Together, the nine precincts comprised a population of 6,566 at that time. The Cleveland and Treasureton areas were transferred to Franklin County in 1918. The portion of the Thatcher area in Franklin County remained within Bannock County until 1946.

In 1953, an aircraft carrying 37 Korean War veterans crashed in the mountains of eastern Franklin County, killing all aboard. This is the most deadly aviation accident in Idaho. A memorial was dedicated in 1967. It is locally known as the Pat Hollow crash site.

Geography

Adjacent counties
 Oneida County – west
 Bannock County – northwest
 Caribou County – north
 Bear Lake County – east
 Cache County, Utah – south

Major highways
 US 91
 SH-34
 SH-36

National protected area
 Cache National Forest (part)
 Caribou National Forest (part)

Demographics

2000 census
As of the census of 2000, there were 11,329 people, 3,476 households, and 2,874 families living in the county. The population density was 17 people per square mile (7/km2). There were 3,872 housing units at an average density of 6 per square mile (2/km2). The racial makeup of the county was 95.11% White, 0.11% Black or African American, 0.29% Native American, 0.14% Asian, 0.04% Pacific Islander, 3.42% from other races, and 0.89% from two or more races. 5.22% of the population were Hispanic or Latino of any race. 34.6% were of English, 15.2% American, 9.1% Danish, and 8.8% German ancestry.

There were 3,476 households, out of which 48.00% had children under the age of 18 living with them, 73.60% were married couples living together, 5.80% had a female householder with no husband present, and 17.30% were non-families. 16.00% of all households were made up of individuals, and 8.90% had someone living alone who was 65 years of age or older. The average household size was 3.24 and the average family size was 3.64.

In the county, the population was spread out, with 37.30% under the age of 18, 9.30% from 18 to 24, 24.20% from 25 to 44, 17.50% from 45 to 64, and 11.70% who were 65 years of age or older. The median age was 28 years. For every 100 females, there were 99.40 males. For every 100 females age 18 and over, there were 98.30 males.

The median income for a household in the county was $36,061, and the median income for a family was $40,185. Males had a median income of $30,071 versus $21,077 for females. The per capita income for the county was $13,702. About 5.40% of families and 7.40% of the population were below the poverty line, including 8.00% of those under age 18 and 5.30% of those age 65 or over.

2010 census
As of the 2010 United States Census, there were 12,786 people, 4,079 households, and 3,259 families living in the county. The racial makeup of the county was 94.4% White, 0.4% American Indian, 0.2% black or African American, 0.1% Pacific islander, 0.1% Asian, 3.3% from other races, and 1.6% from two or more races. Those of Hispanic or Latino origin made up 6.6% of the population. In terms of ancestry, 34.6% were English, 11.5% were German, 11.0% were Danish, 8.0% were American, and 7.2% were Swedish.

Of the 4,079 households, 44.1% had children under the age of 18 living with them, 70.6% were married couples living together, 6.3% had a female householder with no husband present, 20.1% were non-families, and 17.9% of all households were made up of individuals. The average household size was 3.11 and the average family size was 3.56. The median age was 31.5 years.

The median income for a household in the county was $45,682 and the median income for a family was $50,586. Males had a median income of $41,208 versus $25,717 for females. The per capita income for the county was $17,967. About 9.4% of families and 13.7% of the population were below the poverty line, including 20.4% of those under age 18 and 6.7% of those age 65 or over.

Communities

Cities
Clifton
Dayton
Franklin
Oxford
Preston (county seat)
Weston

Unincorporated communities
Mink Creek
Thatcher
Whitney
Fairview
Riverdale

Politics
Like all of conservative Mormon southeastern Idaho, Franklin County is overwhelmingly Republican. The last Democrat to carry the county was Franklin D. Roosevelt in 1944. In fact, the last Democrat to win 21 percent of the county's ballots was Jimmy Carter in 1976, and Bill Clinton in 1996 was the last Democrat to gain so much as one-eighth of the county's vote. In 2016 and 1992 third-party candidates easily outpolled the Democratic candidate, and in the latter case Bo Gritz was only 23 votes shy of forcing Bill Clinton into fourth place.

See also
 Bear River Massacre Site
National Register of Historic Places listings in Franklin County, Idaho

References

External links
 County website

 

 
1913 establishments in Idaho
Populated places established in 1913
Idaho counties
Logan metropolitan area